Elleschodes hamiltoni is a species of true weevil in the beetle family Curculionidae. It is one of the pollinators of the Australian relict plant Eupomatia laurina.

References

Curculioninae
Beetles described in 1897
Insects of Australia
Curculionidae genera